The 1946–47 Washington Huskies men's basketball team represented the University of Washington for the  NCAA college basketball season. Led by 27th-year head coach Hec Edmundson, the Huskies were members of the Pacific Coast Conference and played their home games on campus at the UW Pavilion in Seattle, Washington.

Edmundson stepped down after this season, but continued as track coach until the summer of 1954; assistant Art McLarney was promoted to head basketball coach and led the program for three seasons. The twenty-year-old UW Pavilion was renamed for Edmundson in

References

External links
Sports Reference – Washington Huskies: 1946–47 basketball season

Washington Huskies men's basketball seasons
Washington Huskies
Washington
Washington